Karl Theodor Paschke is a former Under Secretary General for the United Nations. He was born in Berlin in 1935. He studied jurisprudence in Bonn and Munich before working for the Foreign Office. From 1994 to 1999, he served as head of the United Nations Office of Internal Oversight Services. Among other things, he also teaches seminars on the U.N. at the Willy Brandt School of Public Policy.

References 
 
 Paschke calls for increased U.S.-German cooperation 4 April 2006

German officials of the United Nations
1935 births
Living people